Hugh Clark or Hugh Clarke may refer to:
Hugh Clark (actor) (died 1653), English actor
Hugh Archibald Clarke (1839–1927), Canadian organist, composer and teacher
Hugh Clark (politician) (1867–1959), Canadian politician and newspaper editor
Hugh Massey Clark (1886–1956), American philatelist and publisher
Hugh V. Clarke (1919–1996), Australian military historian
Hugh Clark (British Army officer) (1923–2010), British Army Second World War officer